The following is a list of the most populous municipalities in North Macedonia. The total population of North Macedonia in 2002 was 2,022,547.

Municipalities over 20,000 population

North Macedonia is divided into 80 municipalities, out of which 34 have seats in cities or towns, 37 have seats in villages, and 10 make up Greater Skopje. The following lists municipalities in North Macedonia that have a population of at least 20,000.

Population distribution

See also
List of municipalities in North Macedonia

External links
2002 census results

Municipalities
List
North Macedonia